Four-Cornered Circle is a 2007 novel from Australian author Jon Cleary, the last published prior to his death in 2010.

The plot revolves around two sisters, one of whom develops feelings for the other's husband. The story is told from the point of view of the sisters which Cleary admits was a difficult writing challenge "trying to not intrude a man's viewpoint on what the women thought and what they did. But I enjoyed every moment of it because women are much more complex characters than men, much more."

References

External links
Four-Cornered Circle at AustLit (subscription required)

2007 Australian novels
HarperCollins books
Novels by Jon Cleary